Kyle Macaulay (born 13 May 1986) is a former professional footballer who currently works as a recruitment analyst for Chelsea.

Club career
Born in Elgin, he started his career at Derby County but after two years at Pride Park, he was released. Macaulay is the nephew of former Aberdeen manager Steve Paterson and was signed for the Dons by his uncle. He made his debut on 4 February 2006 against Heart of Midlothian at Tynecastle.

In November 2006 he was loaned out to Peterhead before signing a permanent deal with them on 31 January 2007. After leaving Peterhead in the summer of 2007, Macaulay was out of football for a few months until he signed for Alloa Athletic after a successful trial period. He scored for Alloa in February 2008 in a game against his former club Peterhead. He continued playing semi-professional football in the Scottish League system until 2012, when he graduated from the University of Stirling.

Post-retirement career

Ostersunds FK
He began in a non-playing role in Sweden shortly afterwards, working as a performance analyst at Ostersunds FK for Graham Potter.

Swansea City
Macaulay joined Swansea City in a similar role in June 2018, when Potter moved to the Welsh club. Swansea had a somewhat successful season back in the Championship following relegation from the Premier League in the season prior finishing in 10th place and reaching the quarter finals of the FA Cup.

Brighton & Hove Albion
Potter was appointed as the new Brighton & Hove Albion manager on 20 May 2019 where Macaulay, assistant manager Billy Reid and coach Bjorn Hamberg moved to the Sussex club alongside Potter.

Chelsea
On 8 September 2022, Macaulay followed Graham Potter on a move to Chelsea.

References

External links

Living people
1986 births
People from Elgin, Moray
Scottish footballers
Derby County F.C. players
Aberdeen F.C. players
Peterhead F.C. players
Alloa Athletic F.C. players
Scottish Premier League players
Scottish Football League players
Elgin City F.C. players
Huntly F.C. players
Alumni of the University of Stirling
Association football midfielders
Swansea City A.F.C. non-playing staff
Universiade silver medalists for Great Britain
Universiade medalists in football
Sportspeople from Moray
Brighton & Hove Albion F.C. non-playing staff
Medalists at the 2011 Summer Universiade
Chelsea F.C. non-playing staff